Johan Anegrund (born 31 March 1973) is a retired Swedish footballer who played as a defender. During his club career, Anegrund played for Skiljebo SK, IFK Göteborg, Västra Frölunda IF and Örgryte IS. He made 1 appearance for the Sweden national team.

Honours
IFK Göteborg

 Allsvenskan: 1994, 1995, 1996
 Svenska Cupen: 1991, 1999-2000

External links

1973 births
Living people
Swedish footballers
Association football defenders
IFK Göteborg players
Västra Frölunda IF players
Örgryte IS players
Sweden international footballers